1933 Emperor's Cup Final was the 13th final of the Emperor's Cup competition. The final was played at Meiji Jingu Gaien Stadium in Tokyo on October 30, 1933. Tokyo OB Club won the championship.

Overview
Tokyo OB Club won their 1st title, by defeating Sendai SC 4–1.

Match details

See also
1933 Emperor's Cup

References

Emperor's Cup
1933 in Japanese football